Archibald Hamilton may refer to:

 Lord Archibald Hamilton (1673–1754), Scottish politician
 Archibald Hamilton, 9th Duke of Hamilton (1740–1819), Scottish peer and politician
 Lord Archibald Hamilton (1769–1827), son of the above, MP for Lanarkshire
 Archibald Hamilton (1790–1815), officer in the United States Navy
 Sir Archibald Hamilton, 5th Baronet (1876–1939), British convert to Islam
 Archibald Hamilton (bishop) (c.1580–1659), Anglican archbishop of Cashel
 A. M. Hamilton (Archibald Milne Hamilton, 1898–1972), New Zealand-born civil engineer
 Archie Hamilton (born 1941), British Conservative politician, MP 1978–2001
 Archie Hamilton (DJ), DJ, producer and label owner
 Archie Hamilton (promoter), co-founder of Chinese music company Split Works
 Archibald Sillars Hamilton (died 1884) phrenologist in colonial Australia

See also
Archibald Hamilton Charteris, Church of Scotland theologian